Theodoric II, Teodorico in Spanish and Portuguese, ( 426 – early 466) was the eighth King of the Visigoths, from 453 to 466.

Biography
Theoderic II, son of Theodoric I, obtained the throne by killing his elder brother Thorismund. The English historian Edward Gibbon writes that "he justified this atrocious deed by the design which his predecessor had formed of violating his alliance with the empire." In late 458 the Western Roman Emperor, Majorian entered Septimania to attack Theodoric and reclaim the province for the empire. Majorian defeated Theodoric at the Battle of Arelate, forcing the Visigoths to abandon Septimania and withdraw west to Aquitania. Under the new treaty with the Romans, the Visigoths had to relinquish their recent conquests in Hispania and return to federate status. However, after the assassination of Majorian in 461, Theodoric recaptured Septimania and invaded Hispania again. Theodoric sided with Ricimer and the new emperor Libius Severus against Majorian's magister militum per Gallias Aegidius. Theodorics' army was defeated by Aegidius at Aurelianum and his brother Frederic died in battle, which Kulikowski writes "would have important consequences for the Gothic succession." Theodoric was himself murdered in 466 by his younger brother Euric, who succeeded him to the throne.

Described by a Roman
The Gallo-Roman Sidonius Apollinaris wrote a famously vivid and gushing letter to his brother-in-law Agricola describing the king and his court:

References

External links

Edward Gibbon, History of the Decline and Fall of the Roman Empire, chapter 36
Sidonius Apollinaris, Epistulae, Bk.II.

466 deaths
Balt dynasty
Assassinated Gothic people
5th-century murdered monarchs
5th-century Visigothic monarchs
Year of birth unknown